The men's 4 × 100 metres relay event at the 1998 Commonwealth Games was held 20–21 September on National Stadium, Bukit Jalil.

Medalists

* Athletes who competed in heats only and received medals.

Results

Heats
Qualification: First 3 teams of each heat (Q) plus the next 2 fastest (q) qualified for the final.

Final

References

Relay
1998